Mykel Hawke (born November 29, 1965) is a retired U.S. Army Special Forces officer, author, and television and film personality. He is perhaps best known for the television programs he created on Discovery Channel called Man, Woman, Wild and One Man Army. He left Discovery to work on two new programs: Lost Survivors for Travel Channel and Elite Tactical Unit for Outdoor Channel.

Education
A combat veteran, he served as an enlisted soldier and later as a commissioned officer in the U.S. Army Special Forces ("Green Berets"), attaining the rank of captain. He fought rebels and trained UN peacekeepers in war-torn Africa and did combat search and rescue missions during the drug war in Colombia. He holds black belts in Aikido and judo. As required by the Army to be an officer, Hawke holds a college degree, a BS from UNY in Biology. He also holds an MS from UCA in Family Counseling. He was rated in 7 languages in the Army and paid for 3 languages, the maximum allowed, documented in his published language book, The Quick and Dirty Guide to Learning Languages Fast.

Career

Military service
Hawke joined the US Army in 1982. He served on active duty for a total of 12 years; he also served in the Reserves and Guard for 12 more years. He was a Sergeant First Class (E-7) before he took a commission as an Officer, 18A.

He held three Enlisted, Special Forces Military Occupational Skills (MOS):
Special Forces Medic, 18D
Special Forces Communicator, 18E
Special Forces Intelligence Operations, 18F

He retired as a Captain in 2011 from the 1st Special Forces Command (Airborne) at Fort Bragg, North Carolina.

Accolades

Author
Hawke has authored numerous books and manuals, including the following:
2000: The Quick and Dirty Guide to Learning Languages Fast – Paladin Press,  (authored under a pen name "A.G. 
Hawke")
2009: Hawke's Green Beret Survival Manual – Running Press, 
2010: In the Dark of the Sun – Pixel Dragon Press,  (co-authored with Kim Martin)
2011: Hawke's Special Forces Survival Handbook: The Portable Guide to Getting Out Alive – Running Press, 
2019: Family Survival Guide: The Best Ways for Families to Prepare, Train, Pack, and Survive Everything - Skyhorse Publishing, 
2019: Foraging for Survival: Edible Wild Plants of North America - Skyhorse Publishing, 
2019: The Quick and Dirty Guide to Learning Languages Fast - Racehorse Publishing,  (re-issue)
2021: Under a Hard Blue Sky - Pixel Dragon Press,  (co-authored with Kim Martin)

He has also contributed to numerous books.

Television
Hawke has appeared in over 50 TV shows, including:

The Men Who Built America: Frontiersmen (2018)
This TV mini-series by the History Channel, executive-produced by Leonardo DiCaprio, looks at the lives of iconic pioneers such as Daniel Boone, Lewis and Clark, Tecumseh, Davy Crocket and Andrew Jackson as they traveled across America. Hawke was featured as a combat vet and survivalist.

Man, Woman, Wild (2010–2012)
The show featured Hawke and his wife, Ruth, as they had to survive for a half week with limited supplies in wild and inhospitable locations around the world.

One Man Army (2011–2012)
Hawke also hosted the Discovery Channel show, One Man Army, in which personnel from backgrounds such as 
special operations, military, law enforcement, and extreme sports, competed in three areas of speed, strength, and intelligence to win prize money.

Lost Survivors (2013)
The Travel Channel has released six episodes of the series entitled Lost Survivors in which Mykel and Ruth Hawke find themselves in 
remote areas around the world with minimal supplies and few clues as to their actual whereabouts. The couple must then rely on instinct, expertise, and the strength of each other in order to effect their own rescue from these remote locations.

Other appearances

2022: Hawke appeared on the "Discovery Channel's India's Ultimate Warrior"

2020: Mykel teaches Survival to Matthew Broderick & Cast of Netflix TV Show "DayBreak"

2019: Hawke is Resident Expert interviewed on History's Frontiersmen by Leonardo DiCaprio

2006: Hawke appeared as a guest in Dirty Sanchez: The Movie to teach Mathew Pritchard, Lee Dainton, Michael "Pancho" Locke and Dan Joyce survival skills.

Hawke appeared with wife Ruth on ABC's The Bachelor in episode 4 of Arie's season, 2018, where they instructed some of the women in survival on a group date.

He was also one of four survival experts featured in the Discovery Channel's short-lived series, Science of Survival. In Episode 2, "Escape from the Amazon", Mykel spends three days in the Amazon, reducing his survival gear each successive day.

He also appeared in an episode of the fifth season of The Simple Life (styled as The Simple Life Goes to Camp) in 2007, appearing in episodes 7 and 8, as a survival expert, helping campers learn the basics of survival.

Personal life
In 2005, Hawke married Ruth England. They currently reside in Miami, Florida, with their son who was born in London, England.

Hawke established a combat medic school in Azerbaijan.

References

External links

The Travel Channel's Lost Survivors
Man Woman Wild renewed for a second season

1965 births
American male writers
Living people
People from Kentucky
United States Army soldiers
Members of the United States Army Special Forces
Participants in American reality television series
Survivalists
New York University alumni
University of California, Santa Barbara alumni
Discovery Channel people